Lewis James Lawn (9 January 1929 – 20 June 1980) was a New Zealand weightlifter who represented his country at the 1950 British Empire Games.

Lawn won seven New Zealand national weightlifting titles: three in the featherweight division, in 1949, 1950, and 1957; and four in the bantamweight division, in 1953, 1954, 1955, and 1958.

Lewis died in Zimbabwe on 20 June 1980.

References

1929 births
1980 deaths
Weightlifters at the 1950 British Empire Games
New Zealand male weightlifters
New Zealand emigrants to Zimbabwe
Commonwealth Games competitors for New Zealand
20th-century New Zealand people